The 2021 Paris–Tours was the 115th edition of the Paris–Tours road cycling classic. It was held on 10 October 2021 as part of the 2021 UCI Europe Tour and the 2021 UCI ProSeries calendars.

The race took place in the Centre-Val de Loire region of central France. The first  of the  route, which headed net southwest, were slightly undulating and led into the most impactful part of the race, which had nine unpaved sectors totalling  and seven short hills packed into the final .

Teams 
10 of the 19 UCI WorldTeams, 10 UCI ProTeams, and two UCI Continental teams made up the 22 teams that participated in the race. Of the 151 riders who started the race, 117 finished.

UCI WorldTeams

 
 
 
 
 
 
 
 
 
 

UCI ProTeams

 
 
 
 
 
 
 
 
 
 

UCI Continental Teams

Result

References

External links 
 

2021
Paris–Tours
Paris–Tours
Paris–Tours